An esplai is a non-profit voluntary association that works in the field of educating children during their free time. It has its origins in the Scout Movement, and has been popular in certain areas of Spain since the 1960s. "ESPLAC, Esplais Catalans" is the largest and most representative federation in Catalonia.

How it works and activitiesText en cursiva
The Esplai is an entity that works with children and that have different ways of work. It could be like an extra-curricular activity; summer camps and it often is known like a place where children can do weekly activities for two or three hours every weekend. Children and teens can do activities that where energized by a monitor, the person who works in a group like a referent. With all the variety of activities that they make, children and teens can achieve some values, norms and attitudes created by the monitor and shaped in a plan of the group and the entity.  All these activities can change they habitual place because it was chosen thinking about the activity. 

Activities that they can do are like:
-	Game. Like an element for the personal and interpersonal development. 
-	Workshop 
-	Excursion in the nature, to know it. 
-	Sport
-	Coexistence with the same group or all of them. 
-	Personal involvement, participation, get responsibilities and develop an activity. 

Esplai want to work with the intention of doing a community service and with the objective with the children and the teens to grow up with another perspective in life and with a social commitment with the environment. 

Educacional IdeasText en cursiva
Every entity has the ideals, where they expose the objectives, the values and everything that it's considered important to work in. They picked up everything in a PEC (Educational project of the center/ Projecte educatiu del centre). They analyze the environment, the social surrounding and long and short objectives. 

A part of this entity ideals, they make different objectives for every group of ages and they work with the items that they want to achieve. They work with the families too. All the activities have to be adapted to every age and it's better to work with something that is important for them or something that they want to know. 

History 
The Esplais were born in 1876 with the organization Appenzell (Swiss). Then, they were recognized in 1960.

Overview
In 2006, the Esplais had over 35,000 members in Catalonia, where the Scout Movement exists as well.

Esplac, also known as Esplais Catalans is a full member of the International Falcon Movement - Socialist Education International and has a presidium member for the Europe Region along with their sister organisation in the UK Woodcraft Folk.

Esplais have less of a hierarchical structure than the Scouts, but they work in a similar way. They play games, do arts and crafts, have discussions and go on trips. There is a pedagogical aim behind it which promotes the integral development of the child. Typically, an Esplai centre can have about 100 children and 10 educators.

References

International Falcon Movement – Socialist Educational International
Organisations based in Catalonia
Youth organisations based in Spain